The Family Next Door is a 1912 silent short film directed by and starring Romaine Fielding and with Mary Ryan.

Cast
Romaine Fielding - Bob Ford
Mary Ryan - Mary Heap
Robyn Adair - Roy Ford

References

External links
 The Family Next Door at IMDb.com

1912 films
American silent short films
Lubin Manufacturing Company films
Lost American films
Films directed by Romaine Fielding
American black-and-white films
1910s American films